Year 934 (CMXXXIV) was a common year starting on Wednesday (link will display the full calendar) of the Julian calendar.

Events 
 By place 

 Byzantine Empire 
 Spring and Summer –  The Hungarians make an alliance with the Pechenegs, and fight their way through Thrace to Constantinople. 
 Battle of W.l.n.d.r:  The Hungarians and Pechenegs kill Constantinople's inhabitants, inflict severe damage on the countryside, and defeat both the Byzantine Empire and Bulgaria, forcing them to pay tribute. Emperor Romanos I signs a peace treaty with the Hungarians.
 Europe 
 King Henry I ("the Fowler") pacifies the territories to the north, where the Danish Vikings have been harrying the Frisians by sea. He defeats the Danes petty King Gnupa, and conquers Hedeby.
 Summer – Caliph Abd-al-Rahman III invades Navarra and forces Queen Toda to submit to him. Her son the 15-year-old King García Sánchez I becomes a vassal of the Caliphate of Córdoba. 
 Haakon I ("the Good"), a son of the late King Harald Fairhair, once again reunites the kingdom after he has deposed his half-brother Eric Bloodaxe. Haakon is installed as king of Norway.
 The Eldgjá volcanic eruption is the largest basalt flood in history (first documented).

 England 
 King Tewdwr of Brycheiniog attends the court of King Æthelstan and signs the English Land Charters. Kings Hywel Dda of Deheubarth, Idwal Foel of Gwynedd and Morgan Mwynfawr ("the Old") of Morgannwg are compelled to accompany Æthelstan on his campaign against King Constantine II of Scotland.

 Abbasid Caliphate 
 April 24 – Abbasid caliph al-Qahir is deposed and blinded; he is succeeded by his nephew ar-Radi.
 Summer – Ali ibn Buya, a Samanid governor, takes advantage of the anarchy in Persia and conquers Fars (modern Iran). He founds the Buyid Dynasty, and makes Shiraz his capital. Ali seeks the recognition of the Abbasid caliph Ar-Radi, who confirms him later as his viceroy.

 Asia 
 March 16 – Meng Zhixiang, a military governor (jiedushi), declares himself emperor (formally called "Gaozu") and establishes Later Shu as a new Chinese state, independent of Later Tang. He dies after a short-lived five-month reign and is succeeded by his son Meng Chang.
 Goryeo forces push the army of Hubaekje back into its heartland and defeat them finally at Hongseong (modern South Korea).

 By topic 

 Religion 
 Einsiedeln Abbey, a Benedictine monastery, is founded (modern Switzerland).

Births 
 Dong Yuan, Chinese painter (approximate date)
 Wolfgang, bishop of Regensburg (approximate date)

Deaths 
 March 4 – Abdullah al-Mahdi Billah, Fatimid caliph (b. 873)
 May 9 – Wang Sitong, Chinese general and governor (b. 892)
 May 14
 Feng Yun, Chinese chancellor (approximate date)
 Zhu Hongzhao, Chinese general and governor
 May 16 – Meng Hanqiong, eunuch official of Later Tang
 September 7 – Meng Zhixiang, Chinese general (b. 874)
 November 1 – Beornstan, bishop of Winchester
 November 2 – Emma, queen of the West Frankish Kingdom
 Abu Zayd al-Balkhi, Abbasid mathematician and physician
 Gervadius, Irish hermit and saint (approximate date)
 Gofraid ua Ímair, Viking leader and king of Dublin
 Li Conghou, emperor of Later Tang (b. 914)
 Li Renhan, Chinese general and governor 
 Melias, Byzantine general (strategos)
 Olaf Haraldsson, son of Harald Fairhair
 Sale Ngahkwe, king of Pagan (Burma)
 Uallach ingen Muinecháin, Irish poet 
 Xu Zhixun, general of Wu (Ten Kingdoms)
 Xue Wenjie, official of Min (Ten Kingdoms)

References